The Vy 400 is a tiltwing convertible aircraft developed by American startup Transcend Air.

Development

In September 2018, Transcend was flying two electric-powered, one-fifth-scale prototypes to evaluate aerodynamics of the vertical and forward flight transition.
It should be followed by a half-scale prototype powered by a smaller PT6 to demonstrate the drive train.
A 2019 Series A round would fund a full-scale manned prototype flying in 18–24 months, for a 2023 end certification.
A manufacturing partner is sought to certify the aircraft for $350–500 million and produce it.
By November 2018, Transcend had selected VerdeGo Aero to provide hybrid electric propulsion systems after the turbine version.

Transcend Air is based in Boston and led by Gregory Bruell, co-founder of VTOL developer Elytron Aircraft, and Peter Schmidt, former head of air-taxi Linear Air. 

The company wants to establish a short-haul scheduled airline between barges in 46 cities like Boston-New York/Washington, San Francisco-Los Angeles/San Diego or Montreal-Toronto, for less door-to-door cost than the combined cost of existing airlines plus ground transport while avoiding paying for an empty re-positioning leg like air charters, but is skeptical about the on-demand model behind urban air mobility.

Design

Being half the size of the Leonardo AW609 tiltrotor, it would be certified under the FAR Part 23 commuter category, with industry standards for compliance and elements of helicopters FAR Part 27.
Steep approaches and departures would minimize noise and airspace issues.

Its single  PT6A-67F turboshaft from the Air Tractor AT-802 drives wingtip proprotors via gearboxes and shafts, with collective and a  electric tail fan for flight controls with fly-by-wire envelope protection.

It would be sold for $3.5 million like a Bell 407GXP light helicopter but costs per mile will be halved: hourly costs are 50% higher but it is three times faster.
A larger and higher-performance Airbus AS-365N3+ helicopter is slower and too expensive at $10 million.

Specifications

See also

References

Proposed aircraft of the United States
Tiltwing aircraft